The Vermilion River (or the Bayou Vermilion) is a  bayou in southern Louisiana in the United States.  It is formed on the common boundary of Lafayette and St. Martin parishes by a confluence of small bayous flowing from St. Landry Parish, and flows generally southward through Lafayette and Vermilion parishes, past the cities of Lafayette and Abbeville.  At the port of Intracoastal City, the Gulf Intracoastal Waterway crosses the river before the latter flows into Vermilion Bay, an inlet of the Gulf of Mexico.  The river originates at Bayou Fusilier, which is fed by Bayou Teche; winds its way through Lafayette Parish; and drains into the Vermilion Bay below Vermilion Parish.

The river is a "consequent stream" or a "tidal river", which means that the Vermilion was formed from the bottom up.  The river was created by Vermilion Bay: tides and other natural actions in the bay slowly eroded the marshes and other features of the landscape as the river crept northward.  This process brought the channel that would one day become the Vermilion River as far north as Lafayette, Louisiana.  Much later a distributary of Bayou Teche made its way south and eventually linked up with the consequent stream, forming a true north-south flowing river. During times of heavy-rain events, parts of the Vermilion will experience negative discharge, reversing direction and flowing north. At the Surrey Street stream gauge in Lafayette, Louisiana, maximum historic positive discharge was 6,280 ft³/s on July 17, 1989. Maximum negative discharge, -11,300 ft³/s, occurred on August 13, 2016 during the 2016 Louisiana floods.  The reverse-flow phenomenon occurs because the watershed areas in the city of Lafayette are highly developed.  Rainfall runoff from this urban area enters the Vermilion River with larger volumes and at a faster rate than runoff upstream.  This raises the water level in the Vermilion River along the southern areas of Lafayette.  This rise in water levels sometimes exceeds the water level in reaches upstream of Lafayette, thus causing the reverse-flow effect.  Also, when water levels in the Vermilion River exceed certain stages, water begins to enter the Bayou Tortue Swamp Area. This swamp has a great capacity to hold water, which also contributes to the reverse flow effect. The water from the Vermilion River enters Bayou Tortue Swamp through two coulees. Coulee Crow and Bayou Tortue are located upstream of the Surrey Street bridge on the Vermilion River.

In its early stage of development, the only point in the city where water transportation could be secured was at the site of the Pinhook Bridge.  Consequently, property owners and businesses located there. In later years, steamboats ran on the bayou.  However, low water levels and submerged logs hampered their ability to travel.

The importance of the Vermilion as a means of transportation and commerce declined with the introduction of the railroad and the paving in 1936 of all highways leading into Lafayette. The Army Corps of Engineers also had a significant impact on Bayou Vermilion. Water from the Vermilion River is used primarily for rice irrigation and for the dilution of municipal and industrial chemicals and sewage.

The Teche-Vermilion Freshwater Project began in 1976 and was completed in 1982.

In the 1970s, the Vermilion gained a reputation as the most polluted river in the United States. Since that time, improved sewage treatment, low flow streamflow  augmentation, and regular in-stream trash collection have changed the public perception to that of a celebrated recreational resource. A Bayou Vermilion Paddle Trail map has been developed to facilitate and enhance the public’s enjoyment of Bayou Vermilion.

Towns along the river
 Lafayette Parish
 Stekey, Louisiana
 Pont Des Mouton, Louisiana
 Anse La Butte, Louisiana
 Long Bridge, Louisiana
 Lafayette, Louisiana
 Milton, Louisiana
 Vermilion Parish
 Abbeville, Louisiana
 Perry, Louisiana
 Rose Hill, Louisiana
 Banker, Louisiana

See also

 List of Louisiana rivers

References

 Columbia Gazetteer of North America entry
 DeLorme (2003).  Louisiana Atlas & Gazetteer.  Yarmouth, Maine: DeLorme.  .

Rivers of Louisiana
Drainage basins of the Gulf of Mexico
Rivers of Lafayette Parish, Louisiana
Rivers of St. Martin Parish, Louisiana
Rivers of Vermilion Parish, Louisiana
Abbeville, Louisiana